The Military Music Department of the General Staff of the Ukrainian Armed Forces serves as the official service of military bands and choirs in active service within the Armed Forces of Ukraine.

List of Directors General – Senior Directors of Music of the Armed Forces 

 Colonel Gennady Grigoriev (May 1992 – 1995) 
 Major General Volodymyr Derkach (1995–2014)
 Colonel Volodymyr Dashkovsky (2014–present)

History 
In May 1992, in accordance with the proposal of the Chief of the General Staff, the Military Music Department of the General Staff was founded. It was formed in the basis of the Headquarters Military Band of the Kyiv Military District, which at that time was the top military band in the Ukrainian SSR, part of the larger massed bands of the Kyiv Garrison, and one of the best in the Soviet Union. The MMD was also raised on the basis of existing Soviet Armed Forces military bands within Ukrainian territory, such as the HQ Band of the Carpathian Military District. Since January 2015, a total of 41 bands are currently active within the MMD.

Activities 
The MMD-GSAFU accompanies activities carried out by the President of Ukraine, Minister of Defense of Ukraine, and the Chief of the General Staff. It is also responsible for the accompaniment of activities carryed out by the regional garrisons of the Armed Forces of Ukraine. The military bands of the department are regular participants in the Kyiv Independence Day Parade, as well as participants in many military tattoo festivals and concerts in Ukraine and abroad. The military band department organizes the leadership of its bands, as well as oversees the training of musicians by the Military Music Centers of the different branches of the armed forces.

In 2016, 20 musicians from the Band of the 44th Artillery Brigade broke a record by performing the Shche ne vmerla Ukraina nearly 300 metres underground in a salt mine.

Composition 

The band service is made up of the following bands:
 National Exemplary Band of the Armed Forces of Ukraine
 National Presidential Band of Ukraine
 Band of the Kyiv Presidential Honor Guard Battalion
 Military Music Center of the Ukrainian Ground Forces
 HQ Band of the Military Music Center Ukrainian Ground Forces
 Band of the Western Operational Command
 Band of the Northern Operational Command
 Band of the Southern Operational Command
 Band of the Eastern Operational Command
 Band of the 1st Tank Brigade
 Band of the 44th Artillery Brigade
 Band of the 30th Mechanized Brigade
 Military Band of the 27th Artillery Regiment 
 Military Music Center of the Ukrainian Air Force
 Headquarters Band of the Military Music Center Ukrainian Air Force
 Band of the Air Force Central Command
 Band of the Air Force West Command
 Band of the Air Force East Command 
 Band of the Air Force South Command
 Band of the 38th Joint Basic Training Center
 Military Music Center of the Ukrainian Navy
 Band of the Odessa National Maritime Academy - Ukrainian Naval College of Odessa
 Mykolaiv Navy Band
 Marine Division Band 
 Military Band of the National Defense University
 Military Band of the Hetman Petro Sahaidachnyi National Ground Forces Academy
 Military Band of the Ivan Kozhedub National Air Force University
 Military Band of the Military Institute of Telecommunications and Information Technologies
 Military Band of the Odessa Military Academy
 Military Band of the Ivan Bohun Military High School
 Military Band of the Yaroslav Mudryi National Law University
 Military Band Service of the National Guard of Ukraine
 Band of the General Directorate of the National Guard of Ukraine
 Band of the National Guard Military Academy of Ukraine
 Band of the NGU National Honor Guard Battalion Kyiv
 Band of the National Guard Training School 
 Band of the 25th Public Security Protection Brigade
 Band of the 27th (Transport) Brigade
 Band of the 50th National Guard Regiment, Ivano-Frankivsk
 Band of the 21st Public Order Protection Brigade
 Band of the Kharkiv National Academy of the National Guard 
 Military Band of the 8th Special Purpose Regiment of the Special Operations Forces
 Military Band of the 8th Chernihiv Training Center
 Band of the State Special Transport Service of the Ministry of Infrastructure of Ukraine
 Band of the 95th Air Assault Brigade of the Ukrainian Air Assault Forces
 Regimental Band of the Novomoskovsk 194 Pontoon Bridge Regiment of the State Special Transport Service

The National Exemplary Band, as the foremost military band, is the largest in the armed forces, employing over 100 musicians. There are some limits to the number of musicians in each band, with the music centers of each armed service branch employing 52 members, and academic bands employing 21 members.

Current Formation of Massed Bands 

Formation of massed military bands in Kyiv until 1998
 Timpani (optional)
 Chromatic Fanfare Trumpets, Field Drums (optional)
 1st and 2nd Marching Percussion
 Snare drums
 Bass drums and Cymbals
 Turkish crescents (optional)
 Multiple tenor drums (optional)
 Glockenspiels
 Trumpets, Cornets, Flugelhorns
 1st Trombones
 2nd Trombones
 Horns, Mellophones
 Clarinets, Oboes, Saxophones, Bassoons, Flutes and Piccolos
 Baritone horns, Alto and Tenor horns, Saxhorns, Euphoniums, Wagner Tubas, Tubas, Sousaphones

Formation of massed military bands in Kyiv from 2002-2003
 Front ensemble
 Tubular bells
 Orthodox bell set/s
 Timpani (optional)
 Concert bass drum/s
 Chromatic Fanfare Trumpets, Bugles, Field Drums (optional)
 1st and 2nd Marching Percussion
 Snare drums
 Bass drums and Cymbals
 Turkish crescents (optional)
 Multiple tenor drums (optional)
 Glockenspiels
 1st Trombones
 2nd Trombones
 French Horns, Mellophones
 Trumpets, Cornets, Flugelhorns
 Clarinets, Bass Clarinets, Oboes, English Horns, Bassons
 Saxophones
 Flutes and Piccolos
 Baritone horns, Alto and Tenor horns, Saxhorns
 Euphoniums, Wagner Tubas
 Tubas, Sousaphones, Contrabass Bugles, Helicons

Gallery

See also 
 Military bands of the Bundeswehr
 Russian military bands
 Representative Central Band of the Polish Armed Forces
 Representative Central Band of the Romanian Army

External links 
 Військово-музичний центр СВ Збройних Сил України on YouTube
 Band of the Military Academy of Odessa
 Оркестр ПрикВО

References 

Ukrainian military bands
Musical groups established in 1992